Opis is an ancient Babylonian city on the Tigris.

Opis may also refer to:
 Oil Price Information Service
Ops, a Sabine goddess
Opis, one of the Nereids
 Islamabad International Airport, Pakistan; ICAO airport code: OPIS